Corva was a populated place situated in Coconino County, Arizona.

History
Corva was situated along the Santa Fe railroad. In 1913, houses were completed and occupied for area railroad workers.

References

Populated places in Coconino County, Arizona
Ghost towns in Arizona